"Shadowtime" is a song written and recorded by English rock band Siouxsie and the Banshees and produced by Stephen Hague. It was released in 1991 as the second single from the band's 10th studio album, Superstition.

Music and reception
The song is an up-tempo, pop-oriented tune that received moderate airplay on alternative rock radios in the US in 1991. "Shadowtime" was remixed slightly for its single version, giving it a fuller, synthesized sound and adding some background vocals by Siouxsie Sioux.  

Bassist Steven Severin said that "Shadowtime" was a kind of tribute to Roxy Music's For Your Pleasure.

"Shadowtime" reached number 57 in the UK Singles Chart. In the United States, it spent six weeks on the Modern Rock Tracks chart, peaking at number 13 for the week of 12 October 1991.

Charts

References 

1991 singles
Siouxsie and the Banshees songs
Song recordings produced by Stephen Hague
1991 songs
Songs written by Siouxsie Sioux
Songs written by Budgie (musician)
Songs written by Steven Severin